Zanzan District is one of fourteen administrative districts of Ivory Coast. The district is located in the northeast of the country. The capital of the district is Bondoukou.

Creation
Zanzan District was created in a 2011 administrative reorganisation of the subdivisions of Ivory Coast. The territory of the district was composed of the former Zanzan Region.

Administrative divisions
Zanzan District is currently subdivided into two regions and the following departments:
 Bounkani Region (region seat in Bouna)
 Bouna Department
 Nassian Department
 Doropo Department
 Tehini Department
 Gontougo Region (region seat also in Bondoukou)
 Bondoukou Department
 Koun-Fao Department
 Tanda Department
 Sandégué Department
 Transua Department

Population
According to the 2021 census, Zanzan District has a population of 1,344,865.

References

 
Districts of Ivory Coast
States and territories established in 2011